Thinusa is a genus of "sea shore genera" in the beetle family Staphylinidae. There are at least two described species in Thinusa.

Species
These two species belong to the genus Thinusa:
 Thinusa fletcheri Casey, 1906
 Thinusa maritima (Casey, 1885)

References

Further reading

 
 
 
 
 

Aleocharinae
Articles created by Qbugbot